Junonia touhilimasa, the naval pansy, is a butterfly in the family Nymphalidae. It is found in the Democratic Republic of the Congo (Shaba), south-western Tanzania, northern Zambia, and Zimbabwe. The habitat consists of Brachystegia woodland.

Adults are on wing year round. There are slightly different seasonal forms.

The larvae feed on Phaulopsis johnstonii.

References

touhil
Butterflies of Africa
Butterflies described in 1892